Ferdinando Maria Poggioli (15 December 1897 – 2 February 1945) was an Italian screenwriter, film editor and director. He directed fifteen films including the 1940 melodrama Goodbye Youth. He had previously worked as assistant director on a number of films during the 1930s. He committed suicide in 1945.

Selected filmography

Director
 Bayonet (1936)
 Wealth Without a Future (1939)
 Goodbye Youth (1940)
 Jealousy (1942)
 Yes, Madam (1942)
 The Taming of the Shrew (1942)
 The Materassi Sisters (1944)
 The Priest's Hat (1944)

Editor
 The Blue Fleet (1932)
 The Joker King (1935)
 King of Diamonds (1936)
 Tomb of the Angels (1937)
 Princess Tarakanova (1938)
 Tonight at Eleven (1938)
 Diamonds (1939)

References

Bibliography 
 Gundle, Stephen. Mussolini's Dream Factory: Film Stardom in Fascist Italy. Berghan Books, 2013.
 Moliterno, Gino. Historical Dictionary of Italian Cinema. Scarecrow Press, 2008.

External links 
 

1897 births
1945 deaths
20th-century Italian screenwriters
Italian male screenwriters
Italian film editors
Italian film directors
Film people from Bologna
Suicides in Italy
1945 suicides
20th-century Italian male writers